Láskanie ("petting") is an erotic TV show by the main Slovak private TV channel TV Markíza. It was hosted by Kyla Cole between 2003 and 2004.

References

Slovak television series